Below is a partial list of minor league baseball players in the Chicago Cubs system:

Players

Kevin Alcántara

Kevin Alcántara (born July 12, 2002) is a Dominican professional baseball outfielder for the Chicago Cubs of Major League Baseball (MLB).

Alcántara signed with the New York Yankees as an international free agent in July 2018. He spent his first professional season in 2019 with the Dominican Summer League Yankees and Gulf Coast Yankees. He did not play in 2020 due to the Minor League Baseball season being cancelled because of the Covid-19 pandemic.

Alcántara started 2021 with the Florida Complex League Yankees. On July 29, 2021, the Yankees traded Alcántara and Alexander Vizcaíno to the Chicago Cubs for Anthony Rizzo. He started his Cubs career with the Arizona Complex League Cubs. He started 2022 with the Myrtle Beach Pelicans.

Alcántara was optioned to the High-A South Bend Cubs to begin the 2023 season.

Miguel Amaya

Miguel Antonio Amaya (born March 9, 1999) is a Panamanian professional baseball catcher for the Chicago Cubs of Major League Baseball (MLB).

Amaya signed with the Chicago Cubs as an international free agent in July 2015. He made his professional debut in 2016 with the Dominican Summer League Cubs where he hit .245 with one home run and 22 RBIs in 58 games.

Amaya played 2017 with the Eugene Emeralds where he slashed .228/.266/.338 with three home runs and 26 RBIs in 58 games, and spent 2018 with the South Bend Cubs, earning Midwest League All-Star honors and slashing .256/.349/.403 with 12 home runs and 52 RBIs in 116 games. He was selected to play in that year's All-Star Futures Game.

Amaya spent 2019 with the Myrtle Beach Pelicans, batting .235/.351/.402 with 11 home runs and 57 RBIs over 99 games. He was also selected to the All-Star Futures Game for the second consecutive year. He was selected to play in the Arizona Fall League for the Mesa Solar Sox following the season.

Amaya was added to Chicago's 40–man roster following the 2019 season. He did not play a minor league game in 2020 due to the cancellation of the minor league season caused by the COVID-19 pandemic. He is to underwent Tommy John surgery in the 2021–22 offseason.

Amaya was optioned to the Double-A Tennessee Smokies to begin the 2023 season.

Max Bain

Maxwell Aaron Bain (born September 25, 1997) is an American professional baseball pitcher in the Chicago Cubs organization.

Bain played for Northwood University in Midland, Michigan, throughout his college years, while also pitching for the Kalamazoo Growlers in the Northwoods League. He elected to play independent ball with the Utica Unicorns following his college career before signing with the Chicago Cubs as an undrafted free agent.

Bain was assigned to the South Bend Cubs for the entirety of the 2021 season, compiling a 5.52 ERA and 1.484 FIP across 93 innings pitched.

Bryce Ball

Brycelin Steven Ball (born July 8, 1998) is an American professional baseball first baseman in the Chicago Cubs organization.

Ball attended Newman Catholic High School in Mason City, Iowa, and played college baseball at North Iowa Area Community College and Dallas Baptist University. He was drafted by the Atlanta Braves in the 24th round of the 2019 Major League Baseball draft.

Ball made his professional debut with the Danville Braves and was later promoted to the Rome Braves. In 62 games, he hit .329/.395/.628 with 17 home runs and 52 runs batted in (RBIs) over 231 at-bats. The Braves invited him to their Spring Training in 2020. However, he did not play a minor league game in 2020 due to the cancellation of the minor league season caused by the COVID-19 pandemic. Ball began the 2021 season with Rome.

On July 15, 2021, Ball was traded to the Chicago Cubs in exchange for Joc Pederson. He was assigned to the South Bend Cubs with whom he finished the season. Over 107 games between Rome and South Bend, he slashed .206/.351/.387 with 13 home runs, 52 RBIs, and 21 doubles.

Ben Brown

Benjamin Brown (born September 9, 1999) is an American professional baseball pitcher for the Chicago Cubs of Major League Baseball (MLB).

Brown attended Ward Melville High School in East Setauket, New York. He was drafted by the Philadelphia Phillies in the 33rd round of the 2017 Major League Baseball Draft. He made his professional debut with the Gulf Coast Phillies and pitched 2018 with the Gulf Coast Phillies and Williamsport Crosscutters. He started 2019 with the Lakewood BlueClaws before suffering an injury which caused him to undergo Tommy John Surgery.

Brown returned from the injury in 2021 to pitch for the Florida Complex League Phillies and Jersey Shore BlueClaws. He started 2022 with Jersey Shore.

On August 2, 2022, Brown was traded to the Chicago Cubs in exchange for pitcher David Robertson.

Brown was optioned to the Double-A Tennessee Smokies to begin the 2023 season.

Alexander Canario

Alexander Canario (born May 7, 2000) is a Dominican professional baseball outfielder for the Chicago Cubs of Major League Baseball (MLB).

Canario signed with the Giants as an international free agent in 2016. In 2017, playing for the DSL Giants in the Dominican Summer League, he batted .294/.391/.464 with 17 doubles (3rd in the league), 5 home runs (3rd), and 45 RBIs (2nd). He was a Baseball America DSL All-Star.

In 2019, playing for the Class A- Salem-Keizer Volcanoes, he batted .301/.365/.539 (4th in the Northwest League) with 38 runs (6th), 17 doubles (leading the league), 9 home runs (2nd), and 40 RBIs (3rd). In 43 at bats for the 2019 ACL Giants Orange in the Arizona League, he batted .395/.435/1.000 with 7 home runs (8th in the league). 
He was an MiLB.com Organization All-Star, a Baseball America Short-Season All-Star, and a Northwest League Post-Season All-Star.

The Giants added him to their 40-man roster after the 2020 season.

On July 30, 2021, the San Francisco Giants traded Canario along with Caleb Kilian to the Chicago Cubs in exchange for Kris Bryant. Canario appeared in 42 games for the High-A South Bend Cubs to close out the year, hitting .224/.264/.429 with 9 home runs, 28 RBI, and 6 stolen bases. In 2022, he appeared in 125 games split between South Bend, the Double-A Tennessee Smokies, and the Triple-A Iowa Cubs, posting a cumulative .252/.343/.556 with career-highs in home runs (37), RBI (97), and stolen bases (23).

While playing in the Dominican Winter League in the 2022/23 offseason, Canario suffered a fractured left ankle and dislocated left shoulder, and was optioned to Triple-A Iowa to begin the 2023 season.

Owen Caissie

Owen Andrew Caissie (born July 8, 2002) is a Canadian professional baseball outfielder in the Chicago Cubs organization.

Caissie grew up in Burlington, Ontario, and attended Notre Dame Catholic Secondary School. Caissie played for Canada's Junior National team.

Caissie was selected in the second round with the 45th overall pick of the 2020 Major League Baseball draft by the San Diego Padres and was the first player from Canada selected. He signed with the team on June 24, 2020, and received a $1,200,004 signing bonus. Caissie spent the remainder of the summer training in Ontario due to the 2020 minor league season being cancelled because of the COVID-19 pandemic.

On December 29, 2020, the San Diego Padres traded Caissie, pitcher Zach Davies, and three other minor league players to the Chicago Cubs in exchange for pitcher Yu Darvish and catcher Víctor Caratini. He began the 2021 minor league season with the Rookie-level Arizona Complex League Cubs, where he batted .349 with six home runs before being promoted to the Low-A Myrtle Beach Pelicans.

Burl Carraway

Ausley Burl Carraway (born May 27, 1999) is an American professional baseball pitcher in the Chicago Cubs organization.

Carraway attended A&M Consolidated High School in College Station, Texas, and played college baseball at Dallas Baptist University. As a junior in 2019, he went 4–2 with a 2.81 ERA and six saves over  innings. That summer, he played for the USA Baseball Collegiate National Team, as well as playing collegiate summer baseball with the Chatham Anglers of the Cape Cod Baseball League. He pitched  innings in 2020 before the season was cancelled due to the COVID-19 pandemic. He was selected by the Chicago Cubs in the second round with the 51st overall selection of the 2020 Major League Baseball draft. He signed for $1.1 million.

Carraway made his professional debut in 2021 with the South Bend Cubs and was promoted to the Tennessee Smokies at the end of the season. Over  relief innings pitched between the two clubs, he went 3–3 with a 5.30 ERA and 54 strikeouts. He opened the 2022 season with Tennessee. Due to injury, he pitched only ten innings in which he gave up 12 runs and 24 walks.

Dallas Baptist Patriots bio

Luis Devers

Luis Enrique Devers (born April 24, 2000) is a Dominican professional baseball pitcher in the Chicago Cubs organization.

Devers signed with the Chicago Cubs as an international free agent in July 2017. He made his professional debut in 2018 with the Dominican Summer League Cubs and pitched 2019 with them. He did not play for a team in 2020 due to the Minor League Baseball season being cancelled because of the Covid-19 pandemic.

Devers returned in 2021 to pitch for the Arizona Complex League Cubs and Myrtle Beach Pelicans. He spent 2022 with Myrtle Beach and the South Bend Cubs and was named the Cubs' Minor League Pitcher of the Year.

Christian Franklin

Christian Franklin (born November 30, 1999) is an American professional baseball outfielder in the Chicago Cubs organization. He played college baseball for the Arkansas Razorbacks.

Franklin grew up in Overland Park, Kansas, and attended Rockhurst High School in Kansas City, Missouri. He batted .361 over his junior and senior seasons with 18 RBIs and 14 runs scored.

Franklin became the Razorbacks' starting left fielder as a freshman and was named to the Southeastern Conference (SEC) All-Freshman team after batting .274 with 41 runs scored, 34 runs batted in and 12 stolen bases. After the season, he played summer baseball for the Santa Barbara Foresters of the California Collegiate League. As a sophomore, Franklin batted .381 with four doubles, a triple, three home runs and RBIs in 16 games before the season was cut short due to the coronavirus pandemic.

Franklin was named a preseason First Team All-American by Baseball America and by the National College Baseball Writers Association going into his junior year. He was named the SEC Player of the Week on May 3, 2021, after driving in 10 runs in three games against LSU and was a second team All-SEC selection at the end of the regular season. In the opening game of the 2021 NCAA Division I baseball tournament, Franklin had a run-saving catch followed by a home run to spark a come from behind win over NJIT.

Franklin was selected in the 4th round with the 123rd overall pick in the 2021 Major League Baseball draft by the Chicago Cubs. He signed with the team on July 16, 2021, and received a $425,000 bonus. Franklin was assigned to the Rookie-level Arizona Complex League Cubs to begin his professional career, where he played four games before being promoted to the Low-A Myrtle Beach Pelicans. Over 24 games between the two teams, he batted .237 with one home run and eight RBIs.

Arkansas Razorbacks bio

Kohl Franklin

Kohl Riddle Franklin (born September 9, 1999) is an American professional baseball pitcher in the Chicago Cubs organization.

Franklin attended Broken Arrow High School in Broken Arrow, Oklahoma. He missed a majority of his senior baseball season in 2018 while nursing a fractured foot. After the season, he was selected by the Chicago Cubs in the sixth round (188th overall) of the 2018 Major League Baseball draft. He signed with the Cubs for $540,000, forgoing his college commitment to the University of Oklahoma.

Franklin made his professional debut that year with the Rookie-level Arizona League Cubs, compiling a 6.23 ERA over  innings. In 2019, he spent a majority of the season with the Eugene Emeralds of the Class A Short Season Northwest League, pitching to a 1–3 record with a 2.31 ERA over ten starts, striking out 49 batters over 39 innings. Near the end of the season, he was promoted to the South Bend Cubs of the Class A Midwest League and pitched in one game for them. Franklin did not play a minor league game in 2020 due to the cancellation of the minor league season caused by the COVID-19 pandemic. He missed all of the 2021 season due to an oblique injury and shoulder strain. He was assigned to South Bend (now members of High-A) for the 2022 season. Over 23 starts, he went 3–7 with a 6.88 ERA, 75 strikeouts, and 41 walks over  innings.

Franklin's father, Jay Franklin, is a baseball agent as well as the president of BBI Sports Group, representing MLB players such as Dylan Bundy, Ian Kinsler, and Archie Bradley. He is also the nephew of former MLB pitcher Ryan Franklin.

DJ Herz

Davidjohn Patrick Herz (born January 4, 2001) is an American professional baseball pitcher in the Chicago Cubs organization.

Herz attended Terry Sanford High School in Fayetteville, North Carolina. He was drafted by the Chicago Cubs in the eighth round of the 2019 Major League Baseball draft. He signed with the Cubs for $500,000, forgoing his commitment to play college baseball at the University of North Carolina at Chapel Hill.

Herz made his professional debut with the Arizona League Cubs. He did not play a minor league game in 2020 due to the season being cancelled because of the COVID-19 pandemic. Herz started 2021 with the Myrtle Beach Pelicans and was later promoted to the South Bend Cubs. Over twenty starts between the two teams, he went 4–4 with a 3.31 ERA and 131 strikeouts over  innings. Herz won the Vedie Himsl Cubs Minor League Pitcher of the Year award.

Darius Hill

Darius Anthony Hill (born August 17, 1997) is an American professional baseball outfielder in the Chicago Cubs organization. He played college baseball for the West Virginia Mountaineers.

Hill grew up in Dallas, Texas, and attended the Jesuit College Preparatory School of Dallas.

Hill played college baseball at West Virginia for four seasons. He was named second team All-Big 12 Conference and a freshman All-American after leading the team with 75 hits, 20 doubles, four triples, and 112 total bases. Hill batted .307 with four home runs and 46 RBIs as a sophomore. After the 2017 season, he played collegiate summer baseball for the Brewster Whitecaps of the Cape Cod Baseball League. Hill was again named second team All-Big 12 as a junior after batting .329 and finishing second in the conference with 79 hits. He hit .315 with 6 home runs, 25 doubles, and 41 RBIs and was named second team all-conference for a third time in his senior season.

Hill was selected in the 20th round of the 2019 Major League Baseball draft by the Chicago Cubs. After signing with the team he was assigned to the Rookie-level Arizona League Cubs, where he played eight games before being promoted to the Eugene Emeralds of the Class A Short Season Northwest League. Hill was later promoted to the Single-A South Bend Cubs. Hill was assigned to the Single-A Myrtle Beach Pelicans to start the 2021 season. He had 12 hits in seven games for the Pelicans and was promoted to the Double-A Tennessee Smokies. Hill returned to Tennessee to start the 2022 season and batted .308 with 57 hits in 44 games before being promoted to the Triple-A Iowa Cubs.

West Virginia Mountaineers bio

Ryan Jensen

Ryan Austin Jensen (born November 23, 1997) is an American professional baseball pitcher for the Chicago Cubs of Major League Baseball (MLB). He played college baseball at Fresno State University.

Jensen attended Salinas High School in Salinas, California. In 2016, as a senior, he went 2–5 with a 2.75 ERA. He was not drafted in the 2016 Major League Baseball draft, thus enrolling at Fresno State University. He struggled as a freshman in 2017 and as a sophomore in 2018, posting ERAs of 6.60 and 5.35, respectively. He broke out as a junior in 2019, going 12–1 with a 2.88 ERA in 16 games and being named Mountain West Conference Pitcher of the Year.

Jensen was selected by the Chicago Cubs with the 27th overall pick in the 2019 Major League Baseball draft. He signed with the Cubs for $2 million and was assigned to the Eugene Emeralds. Over six starts, he compiled a 2.25 ERA, striking out 19 over 12 innings. He did not play a minor league game in 2020 due to the cancellation of the minor league season caused by the COVID-19 pandemic. Jensen split the 2021 season between the South Bend Cubs and Tennessee Smokies, going 3–7 with a 4.16 ERA and ninety strikeouts over eighty innings. He was selected to play in the Arizona Fall League for the Mesa Solar Sox after the season.

Jensen was optioned to the Double-A Tennessee Smokies to begin the 2023 season.

Fresno State bio

Scott Kobos

Scott Alexander Kobos (born August 3, 1997) is an American professional baseball pitcher in the Chicago Cubs organization.

Kobos attended Myers Park High School in Charlotte, North Carolina. He began his collegiate baseball career at the University of North Carolina at Asheville, transferred to St. Johns River State College after his freshman year, and transferred once again to Coastal Carolina University after his sophomore season in 2017. He was selected by the Cleveland Indians in the 38th round of the 2017 Major League Baseball draft, but did not sign. He missed a majority of his first year at Coastal Carolina in 2018 after undergoing Tommy John surgery. He returned healthy in 2019, and compiled a 6.04 ERA over  innings. He appeared in five games in 2020 before the season was cancelled due to the COVID-19 pandemic.

Unselected in the 2020 Major League Baseball draft, Kobos signed with the Chicago Cubs as an undrafted free agent. He did not play a minor league game due to the cancellation of the season. Kobos began the 2021 season with the Myrtle Beach Pelicans of the Low-A East, and earned promotions to the South Bend Cubs of the High-A Central, the Tennessee Smokies of the Double-A South, and the Iowa Cubs of the Triple-A East during the season. Over 25 relief appearances between the four teams, Kobos went 3–0 with a 2.18 ERA and fifty strikeouts over 33 innings. He returned to the Smokies to begin the 2022 season. He pitched only a total of 16 innings during the season due to injury.

Coastal Carolina bio

Ben Leeper

Benjamin Kyle Leeper (born June 15, 1997) is an American professional baseball pitcher in the Chicago Cubs organization.

Leeper attended Carroll Senior High School in Southlake, Texas. In 2014, as a junior, he went 11–1 with a 0.90 ERA and 106 strikeouts. He underwent Tommy John surgery during his senior year. After graduating, he enrolled at Oklahoma State University where he played college baseball.

Leeper made two appearances as a freshman in 2016 before an arm injury that required a second Tommy John surgery, forcing him to miss all of the 2017 season as well. He returned to play in 2018, pitching  innings in which he compiled a 12.69 ERA. In 2019, he moved into the closer role and pitched to a 4–4 record, a 4.31 ERA, and seven saves with 43 strikeouts over  innings. That summer, he played collegiate summer baseball with the Wareham Gatemen of the Cape Cod Baseball League. He made six appearances in 2020 before the season was cancelled due to the COVID-19 pandemic. Unselected in the 2020 Major League Baseball draft, he signed with the Chicago Cubs as an undrafted free agent.

Leeper made his professional debut in 2021 with the Tennessee Smokies of the Double-A South and was promoted to the Iowa Cubs of the Triple-A East in early June. He was shut down in mid-August after pitching the most innings he had thrown since his junior year of high school. Over 35 relief innings pitched between the two teams, Leeper went 4–3 with a 1.29 ERA and 53 strikeouts. He was a non-roster invitee to spring training in 2022. He returned to Iowa for the 2022 season. Over 42 relief appearances, he went 3–3 with a 4.50 ERA and 57 strikeouts over 46 innings.

Oklahoma State bio

Daniel Palencia

Daniel Jesús Palencia (born February 5, 2000) is a Venezuelan professional baseball pitcher in the Chicago Cubs organization.

Palencia signed with the Oakland Athletics as an international free agent in February 2020. He made his professional debut in 2021 with the Stockton Ports.

On July 26, 2021, Palencia along with Greg Deichmann were traded to the Chicago Cubs for Andrew Chafin. He started his Cubs career pitching for the Myrtle Beach Pelicans. In 2022, he played for the South Bend Cubs.

Reginald Preciado

Reginald Jamel Preciado (born July 4, 1997) is a Panamanian professional baseball shortstop in the Chicago Cubs organization.

Preciado signed with the San Diego Padres as an international free agent in 2019 for $1.3 million. He was then traded to the Cubs along with Zach Davies, Owen Caissie, Ismael Mena, and Yeison Santana for Yu Darvish and Victor Caratini on December 30, 2021.

Preciado was promoted to the Arizona Complex League in the 2021 season, posting a .333/.383/.511/.894 slash line with 3 home runs in 34 games.

Cole Roederer

Cole Roederer (born September 24, 1999) is an American professional baseball outfielder in the Chicago Cubs organization.

Roederer attended William S. Hart High School in Santa Clarita, California. In 2018, as a senior, he batted .392 with seven home runs and 19 RBIs. After his senior year, the Chicago Cubs drafted Roederer with the 77th overall pick of the 2018 Major League Baseball draft. He signed with the Cubs, forgoing his commitment to play college baseball at UCLA.

After signing, Roederer was assigned to the Rookie-level Arizona League Cubs. He homered in his first at-bat of his first professional game. He finished the year in Arizona batting .275 with five home runs, 24 RBIs, and 13 stolen bases in 36 games. He spent the 2019 season with the South Bend Cubs of the Class A Midwest League, slashing .224/.319/.365 with nine home runs, sixty RBIs, and 16 stolen bases over 108 games.

Roederer did not play a minor league game in 2020 due to the cancellation of the minor league season caused by the COVID-19 pandemic. To begin the 2021 season, he returned to South Bend, now members of the High-A Central. He underwent Tommy John surgery on his left arm in July, forcing him to miss the remainder of the season. Over seventy at-bats for the 2021 season, Roederer hit .229 with eight RBIs, five doubles, and four stolen bases. He opened the 2022 season with the Myrtle Beach Pelicans of the Class A Carolina League and was promoted to South Bend after four games. After 14 games with South Bend, he was promoted to the Tennessee Smokies of the Double-A Southern League. Over 71 games between the three teams, he slashed .245/.314/.412 with nine home runs, 37 RBIs, and eight stolen bases.

Cam Sanders

Cameron Ronald Sanders (born December 9, 1996) is an American professional baseball pitcher in the Chicago Cubs organization.

Sanders attended Edward Douglas White Catholic High School and played college baseball at Northwest Florida State College for two years before transferring to Louisiana State University (LSU) for the 2018 season. He went 1–0 with a 5.59 ERA over  innings for LSU in 2018. After the season, he was selected by the Chicago Cubs in the 12th round of the 2018 Major League Baseball draft. Sanders signed, forgoing his senior year of college baseball.

Sanders made his professional debut with the Arizona League Cubs and was promoted to the Eugene Emeralds after one game, finishing the season with a 4.32 ERA over  innings. He spent the 2019 season with the South Bend Cubs, starting twenty games and going 8–4 with a 2.94 ERA and 84 strikeouts over 101 innings, earning All-Star honors. After not playing a game in 2020 due to the cancellation of the season, he played 2021 with the Tennessee Smokies with whom he started 18 games and went 4–7 with a 5.32 ERA and 107 strikeouts over  innings. He returned to Tennessee to open the 2022 season and was promoted to the Iowa Cubs in early May. Over 35 games (17 starts) between the two teams, he went 2–9 with a 4.94 ERA, 111 strikeouts, and sixty walks over  innings.

Sanders's father, Scott Sanders, played seven years of Major League Baseball.
 

LSU Tigers bio

James Triantos

James Douglas Triantos (born January 29, 2003) is an American professional baseball second baseman in the Chicago Cubs organization.

Triantos attended and played high school baseball at James Madison High School in Vienna, Virginia. During his senior year, he hit .712 while striking out only twice and also pitched to a 1.18 ERA, leading his team to a Class 6A State Championship. He was reclassified from the 2022 draft class to the 2021 class and was selected in the draft's second round by the Cubs. He signed for $2.1 million, forgoing his commitment to play college baseball at the University of North Carolina. He saw limited action with the Cubs' Arizona Complex League team during 2021 and posted a .327/.376/.594/.970 slash line in 25 games.

Cayne Ueckert

Cayne Levi Ueckert (born May 28, 1996) is an American professional baseball pitcher in the Chicago Cubs organization.

Ueckert attended Jasper High School in Jasper, Texas, where he earned All-District honors as a senior in 2015. After high school, he played two seasons of college baseball at Panola College. After his sophomore year in 2017, he played collegiate summer baseball with the Anchorage Bucs of the Alaska Baseball League. He then transferred to McNeese State University where he went 3–3 with a 6.17 ERA, 51 strikeouts, and 33 walks over 54 innings as a senior in 2019. After the season, he was selected by the Chicago Cubs in the 27th round of the 2019 Major League Baseball draft.

Ueckert signed with the Cubs and made his professional debut with the Rookie-level Arizona League Cubs, going 0–1 with a 1.90 ERA and 26 strikeouts over  innings. He did not play a game in 2020 due to the cancellation of the minor league season. He began the 2021 season with the South Bend Cubs of the High-A Central, and was promoted to the Tennessee Smokies of the Double-A South after two appearances. Over 26 relief appearances between the two teams, he went 1–1 with a 1.45 ERA, 37 strikeouts, and 12 walks over 31 innings. He was a non-roster invitee for spring training in 2022. He was assigned to the Iowa Cubs of the Triple-A International League to begin the year. Over 39 games (one start), he went 3–1 with a 7.74 ERA, 63 strikeouts, and 52 walks over fifty innings.

McNeese State bio

Full Triple-A to Rookie League rosters

Triple-A

Double-A

High-A

Single-A

Rookie

Foreign Rookie

References

Minor league players
Chicago Cubs